Karin Mannewitz (née Herbsleb on 15 November 1939) is a retired German gymnast. She competed at the 1964 Summer Olympics in all artistic gymnastics events and finished in fourth place with the German team. Her best individual result was 20th place in the uneven bars.

References

1939 births
Living people
German female artistic gymnasts
Gymnasts at the 1964 Summer Olympics
Olympic gymnasts of the United Team of Germany
Sportspeople from Halle (Saale)